Charles Dewey may refer to:

Charles Melville Dewey (1849–1937), American painter
Charles Almon Dewey (1877–1958), judge of the U.S. District Court for the Southern District of Iowa
Charles Augustus Dewey (1793–1866), Justice of the Massachusetts Supreme Judicial Court 
Charles S. Dewey (1880–1980), American politician from Illinois
Charles Dewey (Indiana judge) (1784–1862), Justice of the Indiana Supreme Court